Sir Robert William Chote (born 24 January 1968) is a British economist and chair of the UK Statistics Authority. He was previously chairman of the Office of Budget Responsibility from 2010 to 2020.

Education
Chote completed his secondary education at St Mary's College in Bitterne Park, Southampton. In 1989 he graduated in economics from Queens' College, Cambridge (where he was president of Cambridge University Social Democrats, and, after the merger of the SDP with the Liberals, chair of Cambridge University Social and Liberal Democrats). He then studied journalism at City University, London, and international public policy at the School of Advanced International Studies at Johns Hopkins University in the United States.

Career
Chote began his career as a reporter and columnist at The Independent, and was named Young Financial Journalist of the Year in 1993 when working for the Independent on Sunday by the Wincott Foundation. He then moved to the Financial Times to become Economics Editor in 1995.

From 1999 he served as an adviser to the senior management of the International Monetary Fund in Washington DC, where he worked under Stanley Fischer and Anne Krueger. Chote was appointed director of the Institute for Fiscal Studies in October 2002. He has also served as a member of the Statistics Advisory Committee of the Office for National Statistics.

In September 2010, he was appointed as chairman of the Office of Budget Responsibility, succeeding Sir Alan Budd.  This appointment was subject to Parliamentary approval which was received. He started as Chairman on 4 October 2010. As of 2015, Chote was paid a salary of between £150,000 and £154,999 by the department, making him one of the 328 most highly paid people in the British public sector at that time. He served two five-year terms and stepped down in 2020.

In March 2021, he began as inaugural chair of the Northern Ireland Fiscal Council, which was established to provide independent scrutiny of the NI public finances.

On 1 June 2022, Chote was appointed as chairman of the UK Statistics Authority.

Honours and awards
Chote was knighted in the 2021 New Year Honours for services to fiscal policy and economy.

Personal life
Since 1997, Chote has been married to Dame Sharon White, chairman of the John Lewis Partnership and previously the chief executive of Ofcom. The couple have two children.

References

External links
Bio at the Institute for Fiscal Studies

Living people
Alumni of Queens' College, Cambridge
Alumni of City, University of London
Johns Hopkins University alumni
People educated at St Mary's College, Southampton
British male journalists
1968 births
Knights Bachelor
20th-century British economists
21st-century British  economists
20th-century British journalists
20th-century British male writers
The Independent people
Financial Times editors